A summit is a point on a surface that is higher in elevation than all points immediately adjacent to it. The topographic terms acme, apex, peak (mountain peak), and zenith are synonymous.

The term  (mountain top) is generally used only for a mountain peak that is located at some distance from the nearest point of higher elevation. For example, a big, massive rock next to the main summit of a mountain is not considered a summit. Summits near a higher peak, with some prominence or isolation, but not reaching a certain cutoff value for the quantities, are often considered subsummits (or subpeaks) of the higher peak, and are considered part of the same mountain. A pyramidal peak is an exaggerated form produced by ice erosion of a mountain top. Summit may also refer to the highest point along a line, trail, or route.

The first official ascent was made by Tenzing Norgay and Sir Edmund Hillary. They reached the mountain's peak in 1953.

Whether a highest point is classified as a summit, a sub peak or a separate mountain is subjective. Otherwise, it's a subpeak.

In many parts of the Western United States, the term summit can also be used for the highest point along a road, highway, or railroad, more commonly referred to as a pass. For example, the highest point along Interstate 80 in California is referred to as Donner Summit and the highest point on Interstate 5 is Siskiyou Mountain Summit. This can lead to confusion as to whether a labeled "summit" is a pass or a peak.

Gallery

See also

References

External links

 Peak finder
 Summit Climbing Gear List
 peakbagger.com Information and statistics about the mountain peaks and mountain ranges of the world
 peakbucket.com The activity tracking website for peakbaggers worldwide
 peakery.com Worldwide peakbagging community with over 300,000 peak summit logs and peak lists
 peakbook.org International peakbagging community with worldwide peak lists
peakhunter.org Global summit log project with crowd sourced peak data
hill-bagging.co.uk Database and logging of British and Irish hills

 
Geodesy
Cartography
Physical geography
Slope landforms
Surveying
Topography
Oronyms